Tony Williamson may refer to:

 Tony Williamson (1932–1991), British television writer
 Tony Tallarico (born 1933), comic book artist who used the pseudonym "Tony Williamson"
 Tony Williamson (musician), mandolin player